The Cedar Rapids City Hall and Library, in Cedar Rapids in Boone County, Nebraska, was built in 1913.  It was listed on the National Register of Historic Places in 1994.

It is a multi-function municipal hall featuring Italian Renaissance Revival architecture.

The building has a flat roof and parapets.  It also was a fire station, with a wide garage door on the west side of the main facade.  The area was converted in 1974 to office space.  There was also a garage door at the rear of the building providing access to storage.

References

External links

City and town halls on the National Register of Historic Places in Nebraska
Renaissance Revival architecture in Nebraska
Library buildings completed in 1913
Buildings and structures in Boone County, Nebraska